The Monosoupape (French for single-valve), was a rotary engine design first introduced in 1913 by Gnome Engine Company (renamed Gnome et Rhône in 1915). It used a clever arrangement of internal transfer ports and a single pushrod-operated exhaust valve to replace the many moving parts found on more conventional rotary engines, and made the Monosoupape engines some of the most reliable of the era. British aircraft designer Thomas Sopwith described the Monosoupape as "one of the greatest single advances in aviation".

Produced under license in both seven and nine-cylinder versions in large numbers in most industrialized countries including Germany (by Oberursel), Russia, Italy, Britain and the US. Two differing nine-cylinder versions were produced, the  9B-2 and  9N, with differing displacements giving the larger displacement 9N version a nearly-cylindrical shaped crankcase, with the 9N also adopting a dual ignition system for increased flight safety.

2,188 units were produced under license in Britain, with an uprated  version later built in Russia and the Soviet Union, two of which flew the Soviet TsAGI-1EA single lift-rotor helicopter in 1931–32.

Background
Unlike other rotaries, the early Gnome engines like the Gnome Omega, Lambda and Delta used a unique arrangement of valves in order to eliminate pushrods that operated during the inlet phase of the combustion cycle on more conventional engines. Instead, a single exhaust valve on the cylinder head was operated by a pushrod that opened the valve when the pressure dropped at the end of the power stroke. A pressure-operated inlet valve, which was balanced by a counterweight to equalize the centrifugal forces, was placed in the centre of the piston crown, where it opened to allow the fuel–air charge to enter from the engine's central crankcase.

Although ingenious, the system had several drawbacks: the cylinder heads had to be removed to perform maintenance of the intake valves, and to adjust the timing correctly. Fuel economy suffered in comparison to other rotaries because the inlet valves could not be opened and closed at the ideal times.

Design
In 1913, Louis Seguin and his brother Laurent (engineers who founded the Société Des Moteurs Gnome [the Gnome motor company] in 1905) introduced the new Monosoupape series, which eliminated the inlet valve, replacing it with piston-controlled transfer ports similar to those found in a two-stroke engine. Beginning with the power stroke, the four-stroke engine operated normally until the piston was just about to reach the bottom of its stroke (bottom dead center, or BDC), when the exhaust valve was opened "early". This let the still-hot burnt combustion gases "pop" out of the engine while the piston was still moving down, relieving exhaust pressure and preventing exhaust gases from entering the crankcase. After a small additional amount of travel, the piston uncovered 36 small ports around the base of the cylinder, leading to the crankcase which held additional fuel–air mixture (the charge). No transfer took place at this point since there was no pressure differential; the cylinder was still open to the air and thus at ambient pressure. The overhead valve exhausted directly into the slipstream since no exhaust manifold could be practically fitted to the spinning crankcase and cylinders.  The lack of an exhaust manifold also saved weight and prevented excessive gyroscopic forces in flight.

During the exhaust stroke, scavenging occurred as the air moving past the cylinder exterior lowered the pressure inside due to the direct exposure of the exhaust port to the slipstream. The piston continued its exhaust stroke until top dead center (TDC) was reached, but the valve remained open. The piston began to move down on its intake stroke with the valve still open, pulling new air into the cylinder. It remained open until it was two-thirds of the way down, at which point the valve closed and the remainder of the intake stroke greatly reduced the air pressure. When the piston uncovered the transfer ports again, the low pressure in the cylinder drew in the balance of the charge.

The charge was an overly rich mixture of air, which was acquired through the hollow crankshaft, and fuel that was continuously injected by a fuel nozzle on the end of a fuel line, entering the crankcase through the hollow crankshaft. The nozzle was in the proximity of, and aimed at, the inside base of the cylinder where the transfer ports were located. The fuel nozzle was stationary with the crankshaft, and the cylinders rotated into position in turn. The compression stroke was conventional.

The spark plug was installed horizontally into the rear of the cylinder at the top but had no connecting high-voltage wire. An internal-tooth ring gear mounted on the engine drove a stationary magneto mounted on the firewall, whose high-voltage output terminal was in close proximity to the spark plug terminals as they passed by. This arrangement eliminated the need for distributor and high-voltage wiring found in conventional mechanically timed ignition systems. This ring gear also drove the oil pump, which supplied oil to all bearings, and through hollow pushrods to the rockers and valves and also drove an air pump which pressurized the fuel tank. The later  Gnome 9N engines had dual ignition systems for safety, with twin spark plugs per cylinder which were electrically wired, with the wires routed onto the crankcase and a central pair of magnetos driven by the spinning engine crankcase.

Control
Monosoupapes therefore had a single petrol regulating control used for a limited degree of speed regulation. In early examples, engine speed could be controlled by varying the opening time and extent of the exhaust valves using levers acting on the valve tappet rollers, but this was later abandoned due to causing burning of the valves.[2] Instead, a blip switch was used, which cut out the ignition when pressed. This was used sparingly to avoid fouling the spark plugs, since it was only safe to be used when the fuel supply was also cut. The later 160 CV output 9N subtype also featured an unusual method of functioning with its integral dual-ignition setup, that allowed output values of one-half, one-quarter and one-eighth power levels to be achieved through use of the coupe-switch and a special five-position rotary switch that selected which of the trio of alternate power levels would be selected when the coupe-switch was depressed, allowing it to cut out all spark voltage to all nine cylinders, at evenly spaced intervals to achieve the multiple levels of power reduction. The airworthy reproduction Fokker D.VIII parasol monoplane fighter at Old Rhinebeck Aerodrome, uniquely powered with a Gnome 9N, often demonstrates the use of its Gnome 9N's four-level output capability in both ground runs and in flight.

Lubrication

The lubrication system, as with all rotary engines, was a total-loss type in which castor oil was pumped into the fuel–air mix. Castor oil was used because it did not readily dissolve into the fuel, and because it offered lubrication qualities superior to other available oils. Over two gallons of castor oil were sprayed into the air during each hour of engine operation. This explains why most rotaries were fitted with cowls, with the lowermost quarter omitted to direct the spray of castor oil away from the pilot. Unburnt castor oil from the engine had a laxative effect on the pilot if ingested.

Because the entire engine rotated, it had to be precisely balanced, requiring precision machining of all parts. As a result, Monosoupapes were extremely expensive to build, the  models costing $4,000 in 1916 (approx. $89,000 in 2017 dollars). However, they used less lubricating oil and weighed slightly less than the earlier two-valve engines.

Variants
Gnome Monosoupape 7 Type A
(1916) seven-cylinder rotary engine, . Bore and stroke:  .
Gnome Monosoupape 9 Type B-2
(1916) nine-cylinder rotary engine, . Bore and stroke: . 
Gnome Monosoupape 11 Type C
An 11 cylinder version
Gnome Monosoupape 9 Type N
Bore and stroke: .
Gnome Monosoupape 9 Type R
180 hp nine-cylinder rotary engine, development of 9N with same  stroke.

Applications
List from Lumsden.

Monosoupape 7 Type A
Avro 504
Avro 511
Bristol-Coanda G.B.75
Sopwith Pup

Monosoupape 9 Type B

Avro 504
Airco DH.2
Airco DH.5
Blackburn Scout
Blackburn Twin Blackburn
Blackburn Triplane
Bristol-Coanda T.B.8
Bristol Scout
FBA Type B Flying boat
Nieuport IV
Royal Aircraft Factory B.E.8
Royal Aircraft Factory F.E.8
Short S.80
Short Type C
Sopwith Sociable
Sopwith Type 807 Folder Seaplane
Sopwith Two-Seat Scout
Sopwith Schneider
Sopwith Pup
Sopwith F.1 Camel
Vickers Gunbus (FB.2, 3, 5, 6 and 7)
Vickers F.B.12
Vickers F.B 19 Bullet
 helicopter (licence-built as M-2)

Monosoupape 9 Type N
Nieuport 28
Sopwith Camel
Morane-Saulnier AI
Orenco B

Engines on display
 A nine-cylinder Monosoupape engine is on public display at the Royal Air Force Museum London.
 A nine-cylinder Monosoupape engine is on public display at the Aerospace Museum of California.
 A seven-cylinder Monosoupape engine is on display at Solent Sky.
  One Monosoupape built by Peter Hooker - England is on display at the Museo Nacional de Aeronáutica - Morón, Argentina. It is used during  exhibitions  to explain the rotary engines systems as it shows its  operative internal parts.
 There is a restored B-2 Monosoupape on display at the New England Air Museum, Bradley Int'l Airport, Windsor Locks, CT, USA.
 TAVAS in Australia have two. http://www.tavas.com.au/rotary-engine.php  Both for exhibition in flying aircraft.
 A restored Monosoupape 9 Type N is on display in the Reynolds-Alberta Museum.
 An original (unrestored) running nine-cylinder Monosoupape engine is on public display at the South Australian Aviation Museum in South Australia. A video of it running can be found at https://www.saam.org.au/engines.html

Specifications (Monosoupape 9 Type B-2)

See also

References

Citations

Bibliography

 Lumsden, Alec. British Piston Engines and their Aircraft. Marlborough, Wiltshire: Airlife Publishing, 2003. .

External links

Rattling of a Gnome engine
Ground run of a rare 100 hp Monosoupape in Australia
YouTube video of 100 hp Gnome Monosoupape demonstration
Modern reproduction Fokker D VIII powered with 160 hp Gnome Monosoupape
New Zealand-built (21st century) reproduction Type 9B-2 100 hp Monosoupape running
Classic Aero Machining Service/CAMS Reproduction Gnôme Type 9B-2 Monosoupape reproduction engine development video
Computer video of how the 100 CV Type 9B-2 Monosooupape Goes Together
Koz-Aero's "Look at the Gnome 9N Monosoupape" Article

1910s aircraft piston engines
Monosoupape
Rotary aircraft piston engines